Loreto Secondary School, St. Michael's, is an all-girls secondary school in the town of Navan, County Meath in Ireland. The school, which opened in 1833, is situated on the banks of the River Boyne on Convent Road. The Loreto Sisters St. Michael's Convent adjoins the main and oldest part of the school, with a day-care centre for the elderly situated at the side. There are approximately 52 staff members, including teachers, two career guidance counsellors and ancillary staff. As of 2020, there were 806 students enrolled.

Extra curriculum
The school runs a "social justice week" in March every year. During this week, guest speakers are sometimes invited to discuss issues of poverty and inequality, racism and refugees, human rights and care of the environment. Adi Roche, of the Chernobyl Children's Project, gave an opening address at one of the school's social justice weeks.

The school also provides a variety of sports, and its teams participate in local, regional and national leagues. Sports include hockey, camogie, Gaelic football, basketball, fitness classes, athletics and soccer.

Notable alumnae
 Nina Carberry, jockey

References

Girls' schools in the Republic of Ireland
Secondary schools in County Meath
Catholic secondary schools in the Republic of Ireland
Schools in County Meath
Educational institutions established in 1833
Sisters of Loreto schools
1833 establishments in Ireland